was a Japanese diplomat of the 20th century.

Diplomatic and political career 
The son of Lord Matsudaira Katamori of Aizu, Tsuneo served as Japanese Ambassador to the United States. In 1929–1935 served as Ambassador to Britain, and in that capacity represented his country at the London Conference on Naval Armaments in 1930. During that conference, he was convinced to accept the ratio in ships which appeared humiliating to the Japanese government through the persuasion efforts of one of the US delegates, Senator David A. Reed, who in return agreed to grant the Japanese government better terms on non-combatant ships.

In 1936–1945 served as head of the Imperial Household Agency. His tenure as head of the Imperial Household Agency ended in resignation on June 4, 1945, after he took responsibility for part of the Imperial Palace burning in the American firebombing of Tokyo. During the last year of the war was among the Japanese leaders who acknowledged that the war was lost and suggested searching for early surrender. After the Second World War, for a brief period in 1946, circles related to the Palace attempted to convince the Liberal Party leadership to promote Matsudaira's candidacy as Prime Minister, but the post was eventually handed to Shigeru Yoshida. Tsuneo served as the first chairman of the new House of Councillors from the entry into effect of the new Japanese constitution until his death.

Family 
Tsuneo was also the father of Matsudaira Setsuko, the wife of Prince Chichibu and Matsudaira Ichiro, father of Tokugawa Tsunenari the 18th Tokugawa Head Family.

Honors
From the corresponding Japanese Wikipedia article

Japanese decorations
Grand Cordon of the Order of the Sacred Treasure (31 May 1924; Second Class: 1 November 1920; Third Class: 28 June 1919)
Grand Cordon of the Order of the Rising Sun (11 April 1931; Fourth Class: 1 April 1916; Fifth Class: 24 August 1911; Sixth Class: 1 April 1906)

Works 
 Matsudaira, Tsuneo. "Sports and Physical Training in Modern Japan," Transactions and Proceedings of the Japan Society, London, 8 (1907/1909), 120

Ancestry

References

External links

 Japanese Wiki article on Tsuneo Matsudaira
 Timeline of Tsuneo's life
 Chichibu, Princess Setsuko. The Silver Drum.

|-

|-

|-

1877 births
1949 deaths
Aizu-Matsudaira clan
Ambassadors of Japan to the United Kingdom
Ambassadors of Japan to the United States
Members of the House of Councillors (Japan)
Politicians from Tokyo
Presidents of the House of Councillors (Japan)